Erik Walter Klem (25 July 1886 – 24 January 1965) was a Danish gymnast who competed in the 1906 Summer Olympics.

In 1906 he won the silver medal as member of the Danish gymnastics team in the team competition.

External links
profile

1886 births
1965 deaths
Danish male artistic gymnasts
Olympic gymnasts of Denmark
Gymnasts at the 1906 Intercalated Games
Olympic silver medalists for Denmark

Medalists at the 1906 Intercalated Games